Ramallo may refer to:

People
William Ramallo (born 1963), Bolivian footballer
Tito Ramallo (born 1969), Spanish footballer
Fernando Ramallo (born 1980), Spanish actor
Rodrigo Ramallo (born 1990), Bolivian footballer
Sofía Ramallo (born 2001), Argentine field hockey player
Reverend Mother Ramallo, a fictional character from the Dune series

Places in Argentina
Ramallo, Buenos Aires
Ramallo Partido
Saint Francis Xavier Church of Ramallo

Other
Ramallo massacre, a 1999 massacre in Villa Ramallo, Argentina

See also
Ramalho (disambiguation)